Sisters is a 1930 American crime film directed by James Flood and starring Sally O'Neil, Molly O'Day and Russell Gleason.

Plot summary

Cast
 Sally O'Neil as Sally Malone 
 Molly O'Day as Molly Shannon 
 Russell Gleason as Eddie Collins 
 Jason Robards Sr. as John Shannon
 Morgan Wallace as William Tully 
 John Fee as Johnson 
 Carl Stockdale as Jones

References

Bibliography
 Martin, Len D. Columbia Checklist: The Feature Films, Serials, Cartoons, and Short Subjects of Columbia Pictures Corporation, 1922-1988. McFarland, 1991.

External links
 
 
 
 

1930 films
1930 crime films
1930s English-language films
American crime films
Films directed by James Flood
Columbia Pictures films
American black-and-white films
1930s American films